The 1stBank Center (originally the Broomfield Event Center and formerly the Odeum Colorado) is a multi-purpose arena located 15 miles northwest of Downtown Denver, in the city of Broomfield. It is located near the Rocky Mountain Metropolitan Airport and the Flatiron Crossing Mall. Opening in 2006, the arena naming rights belong to 1stBank, a local financial institution since 2010. The venue is typically used for mid-sized concerts in the Denver Metro area, seating up to 6,500 patrons. From June 2010 until May 2014, the arena housed the Colorado Music Hall of Fame before it moved to its permanent home at the Red Rocks Amphitheatre. For sports, it is the current home of the Denver Roller Dolls and former home of the Rocky Mountain Rage and Colorado 14ers.

History

The City and County of Broomfield unveiled plans for a new sports facility in the Denver Metro area, in May 2005. Led by Jim Wiens and John Few, the venue is an anchor for the 215-acre commercial and residential development, Arista Metropolitan District (also called Arista Broomfield). The facility would serve as competition for several mid-sized venues in Colorado, including the: Magness Arena, Bellco Theatre, Fillmore Auditorium, Budweiser Events Center, World Arena and the (now defunct) City Lights Pavilion. To set it apart from its competition, the arena was designed to give an arena-sized show a theatre (intimate) feeling.

Construction began in October 2006 to a rocky start. Six months after construction began, the venue's owners faced a lawsuit regarding noise control. Before opening, the facility saw staff and management changes. Despite pushbacks, the venue opened on November 9, 2006, with a concert by Bonnie Raitt. However, the facility proved it couldn't stand against its competitors. Many patrons complained of a lack of parking and street sign leading to the venue. Others complained about the acoustics, describing the arena as a concrete barn. For its first two years of operation, the venue did not see a profit. It was unable to pay bills and staff salaries.

Until 2009, the arena was operated by Broomfield Sports and Entertainment (created by Wiens and Frew). Management ceased when the company could no longer financially afford to maintain the failing venue. The Broomfield Urban Renewal Authority (BURA) began seeking a new management company in January 2009. AEG Live, VenuWorks and SMG all placed bids. Operations were passed off to Peak Entertainment—a joint venture between Kroenke Sports Enterprises and AEG Live Rocky Mountains, in June 2009, for 28 years. Chuck Morris, President and CEO or AEG Live Rocky Mountains, was responsible to the revitalization of the Fillmore Auditorium.

Under the new management, the venue saw over one million dollars in renovations. This included a new paint job, window treatments, terrace balconies, improvements to lighting and acoustics. Over 2,000 parking spaces were added, along with a pedestrian bridge connecting patrons to RTD's US 36 and Broomfield Park-n-Ride. During this construction period, the facility was given a temporary name change of Odeum Colorado. In February 2010, it was announced local financial institution,  FirstBank Holding Company of Colorado, Inc. (known simply as 1stBank) purchased naming rights for five years, at an undisclosed amount. The agreement began on March 1, 2010. The arena reopened on March 5, 2010, with a concert by Furthur. Since its reopening, the arena has hosted numerous concerts by popular artists, alongside family shows and sporting events.

Naming
Broomfield Event Center (November 9, 2006—December 8, 2009)
Odeum Colorado (December 9, 2009—February 28, 2010) (no events were held during the time as the arena was being renovated)
1stBank Center (March 1, 2010—present)

Performers

A Perfect Circle
Adventure Club
Arcade Fire
Basscrooks
Bassnectar
Bear Grillz
Big Time Rush
Borgore
Carrie Underwood
Dave Matthews
Dead & Company
Dia Frampton
Dropkick Murphy’s
Excision
Fall Out Boy
Figure
Flosstradamus
for KING & COUNTRY
G-Eazy
Green Day
Hall & Oates
Jean Michel Jarre
Judas Priest
Just A Gent
Justin Bieber
Katy Perry
Ke$ha
Korn
Krewella
Lady Gaga
LAXX
LCD Soundsystem
Lindsey Stirling
Little Big Town
Macklemore
Mark Knopfler
Modest Mouse
My Morning Jacket
Nero
New Kids on the Block
New Order
Nickel Creek
Nine Inch Nails
Oasis
Oysterhead
Panic! at the Disco
Paul Simon
Pavement
Pentatonix
Phish
Phoenix
Portishead
Pretty Lights
Radiohead
Robyn
Roger Daltrey
Sam Smith
Scorpions
Selena Gomez
Shawn Mendes
Sigur Ros
Skrillex
Terravita
The Chemical Brothers
The Fray
The Killers
The Lumineers
The Secret Sisters
The String Cheese Incident
Tom Petty and the Heartbreakers
Usher
Volbeat
Widespread Panic
Ween
Zedd
Zeds Dead
Zomboy

Special events
UFC Fight Night: Florian vs. Lauzon (April 2, 2008)
Strikeforce: Payback (October 3, 2008)
UFC Live: Vera vs. Jones (March 21, 2010)
WEC 51: Aldo vs. Gamburyan (September 30, 2010)
UFC Fight Night: Henderson vs. Thatch (February 14, 2015)
Glory 16: Denver (May 3, 2014)
Glory 34: Denver (October 21, 2016)
Glory 56: Denver (August 10, 2018)
AEW Dynamite (March 4, 2020)
New Year's Smash (2022) (December 28, 2022)
ONE on Prime Video 10 (May 5, 2023)

External links 
1stBank Center at AEG Facilities
1stBank Center at Reed Construction Data

References 

2006 establishments in Colorado
Basketball venues in Colorado
Buildings and structures in Broomfield, Colorado
Indoor arenas in Colorado
Indoor ice hockey venues in Colorado
Sports venues completed in 2006
Tourist attractions in Broomfield, Colorado